Palimbia is a genus of flowering plants belonging to the family Apiaceae.

Its native range is Romania to Western Siberia and Xinjiang.

Species
Species:

Palimbia defoliata 
Palimbia rediviva 
Palimbia turgaica

References

Apiaceae
Apiaceae genera